Granular myringitis is a long term condition in which there is inflammation of the tympanic membrane in the ear and formation of granulation tissue within the tympanic membrane. It is a type of otitis externa.

Without treatment it can lead to narrowing of the ear canal. A number of treatment options exist including putting vinegar in the ear, using antibiotic drops, and surgery.

References 

Diseases of middle ear and mastoid